Senator Lynde may refer to:

Charles W. Lynde (1790–1860), New York State Senate
Dolphus S. Lynde (1833–1902), New York State Senate
William Pitt Lynde (1817–1885), Wisconsin State Senate

See also
James Lynd (1830–1862), Minnesota State Senate